Crunch Time is an American science fiction comedy drama series created by Andrew Disney and Bradley Jackson. It premiered on Rooster Teeth's website on September 11, 2016.

The series follows a group of students who have built a machine that allows them to enter people's dreams. They have somehow caused a black hole to form in their laboratory, leading them to having to explain their actions to the authorities.

The series made its television debut in the United States on El Rey Network on January 8, 2019.

Cast 
 Avery Monsen as Sam
 Jessy Hodges as Hannah
 Nicholas Rutherford as Berkman
 Samm Levine as Connor
 Kirk C. Johnson as Larry
 Brent Morin as Hobbs
 Michael Hyatt as Mullins

Episodes

Season 1 (2016)

Season 2 
On May 20, 2020 Rooster Teeth Productions released season 2 as a cast table read to benefit charity during the Covid-19 pandemic.

Reception 
Crunch Time was released to limited but mostly positive reviews. Jude Dry of IndieWire gave it an "A" rating, writing, "With snappy dialogue and a premise to delight sci-fi newbies and die-hards alike, the twenty-minute episodes of 'Crunch Time' fly by as quickly as a good dream." In The Daily Dot, Audra Schroeder said the show was like a mix of It's Always Sunny in Philadelphia and Weird Science.

References

Rooster Teeth
2016 web series debuts
American comedy web series
American drama web series
American science fiction web series
Comedy-drama web series